Milen Radukanov (born 12 December 1972) is a former Bulgarian footballer.

Coaching career

CSKA Sofia
In 2010, Radukanov was appointed as CSKA Sofia's assistant coach and interpreter for the Romanian head coach Ioan Andone. Because of that fact he is known as the "Bulgarian Jose Mourinho". Later he joined the coaching staff of Adalbert Zafirov, Pavel Dotchev and Gjore Jovanovski. On 21 October 2010, he became the temporary head coach of CSKA. The team showed impressive results under him, which led to his appointment as permanent head coach. His assistants were Todor Yanchev (the team's captain) and Svetoslav Petrov. When Radukanov took the helm, CSKA were 11th in the league table. He managed to take them to 3rd place by the end of the season and also won the Bulgarian Cup and Bulgarian Supercup that year. In October 2011, Radukanov vacated the position of head coach, citing mutual consent, just before the Eternal derby match.

Botev Plovdiv
On 28 October 2011, Bulgarian B PFG side Botev Plovdiv announced on their official website, that they had reached an agreement with Milen Radukanov to take over the manager position at the club. In April 2012, he vacated the position of head coach of Botev Plovdiv following a draw with Etar Veliko Tarnovo. Radukanov was reappointed as CSKA Sofia coach on 11 March 2013, after the club had parted ways with Miodrag Ješić. His second tenure at CSKA Sofia only lasted until the end of the season.

Slavia Sofia
He also managed Slavia Sofia between October 2013 and September 2014.

Honours

As a player
CSKA Sofia
 Bulgarian Cup: 1993
Levski Sofia
 Bulgarian Cup: 1998

As a manager
CSKA Sofia
 Bulgarian Cup: 2010–11
 Bulgarian Supercup: 2011

Managerial statistics

References

External links

1972 births
Living people
Bulgarian footballers
Bulgaria international footballers
Association football defenders
First Professional Football League (Bulgaria) players
Liga I players
OFC Bdin Vidin players
PFC CSKA Sofia players
OFC Pirin Blagoevgrad players
PFC Spartak Pleven players
PFC Levski Sofia players
FC Lokomotiv 1929 Sofia players
Kastoria F.C. players
PFC Nesebar players
Expatriate footballers in Romania
Expatriate footballers in Greece
Botev Plovdiv managers
PFC Pirin Blagoevgrad managers
Bulgarian football managers
People from Vidin